Slobodishchi is a rural locality (a village) in Denisovskoye Rural Settlement, Gorokhovetsky District, Vladimir Oblast, Russia. The population was 39 as of 2010.

Geography 
Slobodishchi is located 19 km west of Gorokhovets (the district's administrative centre) by road. Krutovo is the nearest rural locality.

References 

Rural localities in Gorokhovetsky District